The following article presents a summary of the 1904 football (soccer) season in Brazil, which was the 3rd season of competitive football in the country.

Campeonato Paulista

Final Standings

Championship Playoff

São Paulo Athletic declared as the Campeonato Paulista champions.

References

 Brazilian competitions at RSSSF

 
Seasons in Brazilian football
Brazil